The women's pole vault event at the 2015 African Games was held on 14 September.

Results

References

Pole
2015 in women's athletics